Harrisburg Historic District is a national historic district located at Harrisburg, Dauphin County, Pennsylvania.  The district includes 340 contributing buildings and 1 contributing site in a 19th-century residential area of Harrisburg. It contains the original core of the city. Located in the district is Harris Park, which unifies the district. Notable buildings include the Y.M.C.A. (1932), William Maclay Mansion (1792), Grace Methodist Church (1871), St. Stephen's Episcopal Cathedral (1826), St. Michael's Lutheran Church (1906), Cathedral of Saint Patrick (1907) and the Unit Row Houses. The John Harris Mansion is located in the district and listed separately.

It was added to the National Register of Historic Places in 1976.

References

Historic districts in Harrisburg, Pennsylvania
Historic districts on the National Register of Historic Places in Pennsylvania
National Register of Historic Places in Harrisburg, Pennsylvania